Gomorrah's Season Ends is the second studio album by the American metallic hardcore band Earth Crisis, which was released in 1996.

Legacy
Vocalist Jeremy Bolm of Touché Amoré stated that Gomorrah's Season Ends was one of the albums that changed his life. Code Orange frontman and drummer Jami Morgan named it one of his three favorite albums. Yan Chaussé, drummer for A Perfect Murder, called the title track a "perfect song" and compared it with a "prayer", explaining: "I'm not religious at all... [but] it goes beyond words. It's convictions. The way he sings it... Each member's energy, you feel it ... Everyone puts their heart into it.  ... It's more than a song".

Track listing

Credits
Karl Buechner - vocals
Scott Crouse - lead guitar
Ian Edwards - bass
Dennis Merrick - drums
Kris Wiechmann - rhythm guitar

References

Earth Crisis albums
1996 albums
Victory Records albums